

This is a list of the National Register of Historic Places listings in Jackson County, Michigan.

This is intended to be a complete list of the properties and districts on the National Register of Historic Places in Jackson County, Michigan, United States. Latitude and longitude coordinates are provided for many National Register properties and districts; these locations may be seen together in a map.

There are 29 properties and districts listed on the National Register in the county.

Current listings

|}

Former listing

|}

See also
 
 List of Michigan State Historic Sites in Jackson County, Michigan
 List of National Historic Landmarks in Michigan
 National Register of Historic Places listings in Michigan
 Listings in neighboring counties: Calhoun, Eaton, Hillsdale, Ingham, Lenawee, Livingston, Washtenaw

References

 
Jackson County